Carlos Gershenson (born September 29, 1978) is a Mexican researcher at the Universidad Nacional Autónoma de México. His academic interests include self-organizing systems, complexity, and artificial life.

Biography 
Gershenson was born September 29, 1978 in Mexico City. He studied a BEng in Computer Engineering at the Arturo Rosenblueth Foundation in Mexico City in 2001 and a MSc in Evolutionary and Adaptive Systems at the University of Sussex.
He received his PhD at the Centrum Leo Apostel of the Vrije Universiteit Brussel, Belgium in 2007, on "Design and Control of Self-organizing Systems", under the supervision of Francis Heylighen. He was a postdoc with Yaneer Bar-Yam at the New England Complex Systems Institute.

He is a researcher (investigador) at the Computer Science Department of the Instituto de Investigaciones en Matemáticas Applicadas y en Sistemas (IIMAS) at the Universidad Nacional Autónoma de México. He was the head of the Computer Science Department from 2012 to 2015.

He was also a visiting professor at the Massachusetts Institute of Technology and at Northeastern University during a sabbatical year and has also been editor-in-chief of Complexity Digest since 2009. He has been a member of the Board of Advisers at Scientific American (2019-).

Work and Research 

The work of Carlos Gershenson has been related to the understanding and popularization of topics of complex systems, in particular, related to Boolean networks, self-organization and traffic control. He has deployed his systems in the real world to change traffic patterns in Latin America.

Self-organizing Systems 

During his PhD, Gershenson proposed heuristics to design and control self-organizing systems. He noticed that self-organization cannot be judged independently of a context, i.e., it is not so relevant to decide whether a system is or not self-organizing, but when is it useful to do so. The usefulness of self-organization lies in the fact that it can provide robust adaptation to changes in a system. As particular cases, he studied the problems of traffic light coordination, organization efficiency, and communication protocols.

He has also explored 'self-organizing traffic lights' and also applied self-organization to public transport regulation and other urban systems. Together with Gustavo Carreón, Tania Pérez, Jorge Zapotecatl, and Luis Pineda, he developed the #Metrevolución project, which managed to coordinate boarding and descent of passengers in the Mexico City metro.

Random Boolean Networks

During his MSc studies, Gershenson proposed a naming convention for random Boolean networks depending on their updating scheme.

He has also studied the effect of redundancy and modularity on random Boolean networks.

MOOCs 

Gershenson has been instructor of several Massive Open Online Courses at Coursera, on scientific thought, systemic thought, and artificial intelligence.

Conference organization 

He was co-chair of ALIFE XV, the international Artificial Life conference, held in Cancun, Mexico in 2016.

Gershenson also co-chaired together with Jose Luis Mateos the Conference on Complex Systems 2017, held for the first time in Latin America in Cancun.

References

External links

 Personal webpage http://turing.iimas.unam.mx/~cgg/
 Google Scholar Profile

Mexican computer scientists
Scientists from Mexico City
1978 births
Living people
Academic staff of the National Autonomous University of Mexico
Researchers of artificial life
Scientific American people